Songs from the Heart is the seventh studio album by Christian gospel singer Sandi Patti, released in 1984 on Impact Records. The album was nominated for Best Gospel Performance, Female at the 27th Annual Grammy Awards and won Inspirational Album at the 16th GMA Dove Awards in 1985. The track "Via Dolorosa" won Song of the Year at the Dove Awards the following year, going to its writers Billy Sprague and Niles Borop. The album peaked at No. 2 on the Billboard Top Christian Albums chart. The album has been certified Gold by the RIAA in 1987. In 1990, Songs from the Heart was re-issued on Word Records.

Track listing

Personnel 
 Sandi Patti – vocals, rhythm arrangements (1, 2, 4, 5, 7, 8, 10)
 Mitch Humphries – acoustic piano (1, 2, 3, 5, 6, 8, 9, 10), Fender Rhodes (4)
 Shane Keister – synthesizers (1, 2, 3, 5-10), rhythm arrangements (1, 2, 7, 8, 10), acoustic piano (7), synthesizer and track arrangements (7)
 David Huntsinger – acoustic piano (11)
 Jon Goin – guitars (1, 2, 4, 5, 8, 10)
 John Darnall – guitars (3, 6, 9)
 Greg Jennings – guitars (6)
 David Hungate – bass (1, 2, 4, 8)
 Craig Nelson – bass (3, 6, 9)
 Larry Paxton – bass (5, 10)
 Mike Brignardello – bass (7)
 James Stroud – drums (1-6, 8, 9, 10)
 Larrie Londin – drums (7)
 Farrell Morris – percussion (1, 3, 5, 6, 9, 10)
 Billy Wiggins – percussion (3, 6, 9)
 Kim Hutchcroft – brass (1, 8)
 Larry Williams – brass (1, 8)
 Bill Reichenbach Jr. – brass (1, 8)
 Gary Grant – brass (1, 8)
 Jerry Hey – brass (1, 8), brass arrangements (1, 8)
 Hornworks – brass (3)
 Bobby Taylor – oboe (6)
 Greg Nelson – rhythm arrangements (1, 2, 5, 8, 10)

Nashville String Machine (3-7, 9-11)
 Alan Moore – arrangements (2, 4, 10)
 David T. Clydesdale – orchestrations (3, 6, 9), arrangements (3, 6, 9, 11), conductor (3, 6, 9)
 Don Hart – arrangements (4)
 Shane Keister – arrangements (7)
 Greg Nelson – conductor (2, 5, 10, 11)
 Carl Gorodetzky – concertmaster 
 Inez Boyle, David Christensen, Roy Christensen, Martha McCrory, Mark Tanner and David Vanderkooi – cello
 Nathan Kahn, Edgar Meyer and Craig Nelson – double bass
 Mary Alice Hopefinger – harp (3, 5, 9)
 John Borg, Virginia Christensen, Connie Collopy, Kathryn Plummer, Gary Vanosdale and Kristin Wilkinson – viola 
 George Binkley, Charles Everett, William Fitzpatrick, Rosemary Harris, Larry Harvin, Janet Hazen, Connie Heard, Lee Larrison, Rebecca Lynch, Phyllis Mazza, Ted Madsen, Dennis Molchan, Laura Molyneaux, Pamela Sixfin, Christian Teal and Stephanie Woolf – violin 

Backing vocals
 Sandi Patti – arrangements (1, 5, 7, 10)
 Craig Patty – arrangements (1)
 Mike Patty – arrangements (1)
 Alan Moore – arrangements (2, 8)
Singers
 Sandi Patti (1, 2, 3, 5, 7, 8, 9)
 Craig Patty (1, 2, 3, 6-9)
 Mike Patty (1, 3, 6, 9)
 Cozette Byrd (2, 3, 7, 9)
 Bonnie Keen (2, 3, 7, 8, 9)
 Marty McCall (2, 3, 6-9)
 Melodie Tunney (2, 3, 7, 8, 9)
 Lori Brooks (3, 9)
 Jackie Cusic (3, 9)
 Dave Durham (3, 6, 9)
 Rick Gibson (3, 6, 9)
 Steve Green (3, 6, 9)
 Sandie Hall Brooks (3, 8, 9)
 John Mohr (3, 6, 9)
 Luanne Mohr (3, 9)
 Gary Musick (3, 6, 9)
 The Kathie Hill Children's Singers (10)
 The Pinebrook Children's Choir – introductory vocals (10)

Production 
 John Helvering – executive producer 
 Greg Nelson – producer 
 Sandi Patti – producer 
 Joe Neil – engineer 
 Bill Brunt – design 
 Michael Borum – photography

Charts

Radio singles

Certifications and sales

Accolades
GMA Dove Awards
1985 Female Vocalist of the Year
1985 Artist of the Year

References

1984 albums
Sandi Patty albums
Impact Records albums